Screentime is an Australian television production company, which develops and produces scripted and unscripted television programs in Australia and New Zealand. The company has produced numerous popular series including Popstars, the Underbelly format, RBT and Janet King.

In 2012, French company Banijay Group acquired a majority stake in Screentime.

History

The company was formed by Bob Campbell and Des Monaghan with Capital Investment Group in 1996. Screentime's first production was New Zealand talk show 5.30 with Jude on TV One which ran for three seasons.

In 1999, Screentime bought the format rights to talent competition Popstars from its New Zealand creator, and went on to sell and co-produce adaptations of the format internationally. In 2002, it was estimated that Screentime earned 20 percent of revenue generated from Popstars: The Rivals.

In 2012, Banijay Group purchased a controlling stake in Screentime, giving Screentime the rights to adapt Banijay formats in Australia. Des Monaghan stood down from his executive position at Screentime in 2014.

In 2015, Screentime sold its 49% stake in Irish production company Shinawil.

In 2019, Screentime partnered with the Screen Makers Conference in Adelaide.

Productions 
 Programs with a shaded background indicate the program is still in production.

References

External links

Television production companies of Australia
Australian companies established in 1996
Mass media companies established in 1996
2012 mergers and acquisitions
Banijay
Australian subsidiaries of foreign companies